The Tennessee Justice Center (TJC) is a non-profit public policy advocacy organization and law firm based in Nashville, Tennessee. It was established in 1996 to represent approximately 1.3 million Tennessee low-income families by helping shape public policy and through class action lawsuits. In 1996,  the United States Congress had ordered that federally funded legal services programs no longer pursue class actions.  Since its formation, the Tennessee Justice Center has helped thousands of poor families secure needed health care, assistance, and food aid.

See also
Legal Services Corporation 
TennCare

References

External links

tennessee.gov - Bureau of TennCare

1996 establishments in Tennessee
Government watchdog groups in the United States
Legal advocacy organizations in the United States
Non-profit organizations based in Tennessee
Organizations established in 1996
Political advocacy groups in the United States